A tortoise is a land-dwelling reptile, protected by a shell, of the order Testudines.

Tortoise may also refer to:

Arts, entertainment, and media
 Chelys, ancient Greek lyre meaning "Tortoise" or "Turtle"
 Tortoise (band), a US post-rock band formed in 1990
 Tortoise (album), their debut 1994 release
 Tortoise Media, a British news media platform
 Tortoises, a 1921 short volume of D. H. Lawrence poetry, all later collected in Birds, Beasts and Flowers (1923)
 Tortoise Matsumoto (born 1966), lead singer of a Japanese rock band Ulfuls

Geometry
 Tortoise coordinate, the foundation of the Eddington–Finkelstein coordinates

Warfare
 Tortoise formation, a defensive formation employed by Ancient Rome
 Tortoise heavy assault tank, a British heavy assault gun

See also
 Hare (disambiguation), for Tortoise and Hare stories
 TortoiseBzr, a GUI integrated Bazaar client for the Microsoft Windows platform
 TortoiseCVS, a GUI integrated CVS client for the Microsoft Windows platform
 TortoiseGit, a GUI integrated Git client for the Microsoft Windows platform
 TortoiseHg, a GUI integrated Mercurial client
 TortoiseSVN, a GUI integrated Subversion client for the Microsoft Windows platform
 Tortoiseshell (disambiguation)
 Turtle (disambiguation)